This is a list of the major honours won by basketball clubs in Greece. It lists every Greek professional basketball club to have won one of the two major Greek national domestic trophies, the Greek League championship and the Greek Cup title, as well as any of the major official European continental-wide competitions.

Honours table

External links
 Official HEBA Site 
 Official Hellenic Basketball Federation Site 
 Euroleague.net HEBA - Greek League Page